Mechanical Wonder is the fifth album by Ocean Colour Scene. It peaked on the UK album chart at #7 and lasted four weeks in the top 75. To date, it is the last Ocean Colour Scene release to enter the top 10.

The title is believed to be anti-dance music, as are the lyrics; "the Mechanical Wonder is... ...just a noise in my room." However, the band deny this. Simon Fowler wrote in the liner notes of the band's greatest hits album "Songs for the Front Row" that the title referred to cars on the motorway. Live however, Simon Fowler often sings "and the radio plays only fucking Radio 1", a possible reference to the lack of airplay the band get. The other single from the album was "Up on the Downside", which fared better in the charts. The album was not a success, marking the end of the Britpop success of the band.  After the failure of the album, the band decided to release themselves from their contract with their record label.

Track listing
"Up on the Downside"
"In my Field"
"Sail on my Boat"
"Biggest Thing"
"We Made it More"
"Give me a Letter"
"Mechanical Wonder"
"You Are Amazing"
"If I Gave You My Heart"
"Can't Get Back to the Baseline"
"Something For Me" (UK Bonus Track)
"Anyway, Anyhow, Anywhere" (Japanese Bonus Track)

References

External links

Mechanical Wonder at YouTube (streamed copy where licensed)

2001 albums
Ocean Colour Scene albums
Island Records albums